Diamonds in the Rough or Diamond in the Rough may refer to:

Music
"Diamonds in the Rough", a song by The Carter Family from the album The Original and Great Carter Family
Diamonds in the Rough (album), a 1972 album by John Prine
Diamond in the Rough, 1974 album by Syl Johnson
Diamond in the Rough (album), a 1976 album by Jessi Colter, and the title song
"Diamond in the Rough", a song by Shawn Colvin from the 1989 album Steady On
"Diamond in the Rough", a song by Airbourne from the 2007 album Runnin' Wild
"Diamond in the Rough", a song by Social Distortion from the 2011 album Hard Times and Nursery Rhymes
"Diamond in the Rough", a song by Alan Menken & Chad Beguelin, from the 2011 musical adaptation of Disney's  Aladdin

Other uses
Diamond in the Rough (manga), a manga series
Diamond in the Rough (Modern Family), a 2012 episode of the television series Modern Family
The Diamonds in the Rough, a professional wrestling stable

See also
Rough Diamond (disambiguation)
Live in the LBC & Diamonds in the Rough, an album by Avenged Sevenfold